Joseph Befe Ateba (April 25, 1962 – June 4, 2014) was a Roman Catholic bishop.

Ordained to the priesthood in 1987, Ateba was appointed the first bishop of the Roman Catholic Diocese of Kribi, Cameroon, in 2008. He died while still in office.

Notes

1962 births
2014 deaths
21st-century Roman Catholic bishops in Cameroon
Roman Catholic bishops of Kribi